Cambridge University was a university constituency electing two members to the British House of Commons, from 1603 to 1950.

Franchise and method of election
This university constituency was created by a Royal Charter of 1603. It was abolished in 1950 by the Representation of the People Act 1948.

The constituency was not a geographical area. Its electorate consisted of the graduates of the University of Cambridge. Before 1918 the franchise was restricted to male graduates with a Doctorate or Master of Arts degree. Sedgwick records that there were 377 electors in 1727. For the 1754–1790 period, Namier and Brooke estimated the electorate at about 500.

The constituency returned two Members of Parliament. Before 1918 they were elected by plurality-at-large voting, but from 1918 onwards the two members were elected by the Single Transferable Vote method.

History 
In the early 18th century, the electors of both English universities were mostly Tories, but the Whig ministers of King George I were able to persuade him to use his royal prerogative to confer Cambridge doctorates on a large number of Whigs, so that from 1727 the university largely returned Whig representatives. At Oxford, the King did not enjoy the same prerogative power, so that the University of Oxford constituency remained Tory, and indeed often Jacobite, in its preferences.

The leading 18th-century Whig politician Thomas Pelham-Holles, 1st Duke of Newcastle, was Chancellor of the University of Cambridge from 1748 to 1768 and recommended to the electors suitable candidates to represent them in Parliament. This practice continued under his successor, another Whig Duke and Prime Minister, Augustus FitzRoy, 3rd Duke of Grafton, Chancellor of the university from 1768 to 1811. However, Grafton was less influential as a politician than Newcastle had been and also less attentive towards the university, and as a result some of his nominations came in for criticism, notably that of his friend Richard Croftes.

Croftes was far from typical of a university member of parliament: he was neither the son of a peer, like the Hon. John Townshend, the Marquess of Granby, and Grafton's own son the Earl of Euston, nor a distinguished lawyer-politician, such as William de Grey, James Mansfield, and Sir Vicary Gibbs, nor a prominent political figure like William Pitt the Younger and Lord Henry Petty. In the late 18th and early 19th centuries, Pittite and Tory candidates began to be elected. At the appearance of this political development, some of the Pittite members, including the younger William Pitt himself, one of the members for the university from 1784 to 1806, described themselves as Whigs. As time passed, the division between the 19th century Tory and Whig parties became clearer.

The future Prime Minister, Viscount Palmerston, retained his university seat as a Whig after he left the Tory ranks, but in 1831 he was defeated. After Palmerston ceased to represent the university he was elected by a territorial constituency. From then until the 1920s, all of the university's members were Tories and/or Conservatives.

Even after the introduction of the single transferable vote in 1918, most of the members continued to be elected as Conservatives.

Members of Parliament 
This is a list of people who have been elected to represent this university in the Parliament of the United Kingdom.

1603 to 1660 

 Constituency created 1603

1660 to 1784

1784 to 1950 

Notes:-
 1 Pitt called himself a Whig, but is usually retrospectively regarded as a Tory since most of his followers (whether their background was in the Whig or Tory tradition) came to call themselves the Tory Party in the decade after Pitt's death.
 2 Jebb died on 10 December 1905 – seat vacant at dissolution.
 3 Co. is an abbreviation for Coalition.
 4 Ind. is an abbreviation for Independent.
 5 Sir Geoffrey G. Butler died on 2 May 1929 – seat vacant at dissolution.

Elections before 1715

Election by Block Vote 1715–1918

Elections in the 1710s

Elections in the 1720s 
 Death of Paske

 Note (1722): Stooks Smith gives Willoughby 319 votes.

 Note (1727): Unusually, for a pre-1832 election, Stooks Smith records the total number of electors for the constituency as well as the number who voted; so a turnout figure can be calculated.

Elections in the 1730s 

 Note (1734): Goodrick was an Opposition Whig

Elections in the 1740s 

 Seat vacated when Finch was appointed a Groom of the Bedchamber

Elections in the 1750s 

 Seat vacated when Finch was appointed to an office

Elections in the 1760s 
 Seat vacated when Finch was appointed to an office

Elections in the 1770s 
 Seat vacated on the appointment of Yorke as Lord Chancellor

 Seat vacated on the appointment of de Grey as Chief Justice of the Court of Common Pleas

 Succession of Granby as the 4th Duke of Rutland

Elections in the 1780s 

 Note (1780): Stooks Smith records Townshend as getting 237 votes.
 Seat vacated on Townshend being appointed to an office

 Seat vacated on Townshend being appointed to an office

 Seat vacated on Mansfield being appointed as Solicitor General for England and Wales

 The 1784 election was broadly a contest between the new government of Pitt and the ousted Fox-North Coalition, in which both Townshend and Mansfield had held office.

Elections in the 1790s 

 Note (1790): Party labels in the 1790–1832 period follow Stooks Smith, who classifies Pitt and his Pittite supporters as Tories without regard to what they would have actually called themselves.
 Seat vacated on Pitt being appointed Lord Warden of the Cinque Ports

 Seat vacated on Euston being appointed to an office

Elections in the 1800s 

 Seat vacated on Pitt being appointed Chancellor of the Exchequer

 Death of Pitt

 Palmerston was a Peer of Ireland

Elections in the 1810s 
 Succession of Euston as the 4th Duke of Grafton

 Seat vacated on Gibbs being appointed a Judge of the Court of Common Pleas

Elections in the 1820s 

 Death of Smyth

 Seat vacated on the appointment of Copley as Lord Chancellor and creation as 1st Baron Lyndhurst

 Note (1827): Unusually for a pre-1832 election Stooks Smith provides a total electorate figure, so a turnout percentage can be calculated. See the 1727 result above for another instance.
 Seat vacated on the appointment of Tindal as Chief Justice of the Court of Common Pleas

Elections in the 1830s 

 Seat vacated on the appointment of Palmerston as Secretary of State for Foreign Affairs

 Manners-Sutton created 'The 1st Viscount Canterbury'.

 Note (1837): McCalmont's Parliamentary Poll Book classifies Law as a Peelite between this election and that of 1847.

Elections in the 1840s 

 Note (1841): McCalmont's Parliamentary Poll Book classifies Goulburn as a Liberal Conservative and Law as a Peelite for this election.
 Goulburn appointed Chancellor of the Exchequer.

 

 Note 1 (1847): 3,800 registered electors; 4,682 votes cast; minimum possible turnout estimated by dividing votes by 2. To the extent that electors did not use both their votes, the figure will be an underestimate.
 Note 2 (1847): McCalmont's Parliamentary Poll Book classifies Goulburn as a Liberal Conservative and Law as a Peelite for this election.

Elections in the 1850s 
 Death of Law.

 Note (1852): McCalmont's Parliamentary Poll Book classifies Goulburn as a Liberal Conservative for this election.
 Death of Goulburn.

 Appointment of Walpole as Secretary of State for the Home Department.

Elections in the 1860s 

 Appointment of Walpole as Secretary of State for the Home Department.

 Appointment of Selwyn as Solicitor-General.

 Appointment of Selwyn as Judge of the Court of Appeal in Chancery.

Elections in the 1870s

Elections in the 1880s 

Walpole's resignation caused a by-election.

Raikes was appointed Postmaster General, requiring a by-election.

Beresford-Hope's death caused a by-election.

Elections in the 1890s

Elections in the 1900s

Elections in the 1910s

Elections 1918–1950 
General Elections, from 1918 when most constituencies polled on the same day, were on different polling days than for territorial constituencies. The polls for university constituencies were open for five days. The elections were also conducted by Single Transferable Vote.

Elections in the 1910s

Elections in the 1920s 

 As two candidates achieved the quota only one count was necessary

 As two candidates achieved the quota only one count was necessary

Elections in the 1930s 

 As two candidates achieved the quota only one count was necessary

Elections in the 1940s

See also 
List of former United Kingdom Parliament constituencies

References 
 Boundaries of Parliamentary Constituencies 1885–1972, compiled and edited by F.W.S. Craig (Parliamentary Reference Publications 1972)
 British Parliamentary Election Results 1832–1885, compiled and edited by F.W.S. Craig (Macmillan Press 1977)
 British Parliamentary Election Results 1885–1918, compiled and edited by F.W.S. Craig (Macmillan Press 1974)
 British Parliamentary Election Results 1918–1949, compiled and edited by F.W.S. Craig (Macmillan Press, revised edition 1977)
 McCalmont's Parliamentary Poll Book: British Election Results 1832–1918 (8th edition, The Harvester Press 1971)
 The House of Commons 1715–1754, by Romney Sedgwick (HMSO 1970)
 The House of Commons 1754–1790, by Sir Lewis Namier and John Brooke (HMSO 1964)
 The Parliaments of England by Henry Stooks Smith (1st edition published in three volumes 1844–50), second edition edited (in one volume) by F.W.S. Craig (Political Reference Publications 1973)
 Who's Who of British Members of Parliament: Volume I 1832–1885, edited by M. Stenton (The Harvester Press 1976)
 Who's Who of British Members of Parliament, Volume II 1886–1918, edited by M. Stenton and S. Lees (Harvester Press 1978)
 Who's Who of British Members of Parliament, Volume III 1919–1945, edited by M. Stenton and S. Lees (Harvester Press 1979)
 Who's Who of British Members of Parliament, Volume IV 1945–1979, edited by M. Stenton and S. Lees (Harvester Press 1981)

Specific

University constituencies of the Parliament of the United Kingdom
Parliamentary constituencies in the East of England (historic)
Constituencies of the Parliament of the United Kingdom established in 1603
Constituencies of the Parliament of the United Kingdom disestablished in 1950
Parliamentary constituency
Constituencies of the Parliament of the United Kingdom represented by a sitting Prime Minister
University (UK Parliament constituency)
1603 establishments in England